The South Fork San Joaquin River is the largest headwater of the San Joaquin River in central California, United States.

Course
It flows northwest through the narrow Goddard Canyon, receiving Evolution Creek from the east, then leaves the park at the confluence with Piute Creek from the north, entering the Sierra National Forest. It then flows west, through Blayney Meadows, into Florence Lake, impounded by Florence Lake Dam. Below the dam it flows briefly north, receiving Bear Creek, before turning west again, through a wider valley past Mono Hot Springs then receiving its main tributary, Mono Creek, from the north. The South Fork enters the Ansel Adams Wilderness as it turns northwest, receiving Four Forks and Rube Creeks before crossing into Madera County. Soon after entering Madera County, it joins the San Joaquin River, in a deep granite canyon below Balloon Dome at San Joaquin river mile 334 (km 537), a short distance above Mammoth Pool Reservoir.

River modifications
The Florence Lake Dam, as well as Vermillion Valley Dam on Mono Creek which forms Lake Thomas A. Edison, are both part of the Big Creek Hydroelectric Project operated by Southern California Edison to provide electricity to Los Angeles. In 1925, water was first diverted from the South Fork via the Ward Tunnel into Huntington Lake. The concrete multiple-arch Florence Lake dam was completed in 1926 to ensure a year-round water supply for the tunnel. The larger, earthen Vermillion Valley Dam was built much later, in 1953. The dams divert a considerable amount of water from the South Fork for power generation, especially during the late summer and fall when water flows are already naturally low.

Recreation
Below the Florence Lake Dam river flows are less reliable due to water diversions, except in years of particularly heavy snowmelt.

See also
List of rivers of California

References

Rivers of Fresno County, California
Rivers of Madera County, California
Tributaries of the San Joaquin River